Erling Stuer Lauridsen (27 November 1916 – 12 March 2012) was a Danish wrestler. He competed in the men's Greco-Roman light heavyweight at the 1948 Summer Olympics.

References

External links
 

1916 births
2012 deaths
Danish male sport wrestlers
Olympic wrestlers of Denmark
Wrestlers at the 1948 Summer Olympics
People from Kongens Lyngby
Sportspeople from the Capital Region of Denmark